are the findings of the Lytton Commission, entrusted in 1931 by the League of Nations in an attempt to evaluate the Mukden Incident, which led to the Empire of Japan's seizure of Manchuria.

The five-member commission headed by British politician The Earl of Lytton announced its conclusions in October 1932. It stated that Japan was the aggressor, had wrongfully invaded Manchuria and that it should be returned to the Chinese. It also argued that the Japanese puppet state of Manchukuo should not be recognized, and recommended Manchurian autonomy under Chinese sovereignty. The League of Nations General Assembly adopted the report, and Japan quit the League. The recommendations went into effect after Japan surrendered in 1945.

The Commission 
The Lytton Commission, headed by Lord Lytton, included four other members, one each from the US (Major General Frank Ross McCoy), Germany (Dr. Heinrich Schnee), Italy (Luigi Aldrovandi Marescotti), and France (General Henri Claudel). The group spent six weeks in Manchuria in spring 1932 (despite having been sent in December 1931) on a fact-finding mission after they had met government leaders in the Republic of China and in Japan. It was hoped that the report would defuse the hostilities between Japan and China and thus help maintain peace and stability in the Far East.

Lytton Report 

The Lytton Report contained an account of the situation in Manchuria before September 1931, when the Mukden Incident took place as the Japanese army (without authorization from the Japanese government) seized the large Chinese province of Manchuria. The Report described the unsatisfactory features of the Chinese administration and giving weight to the various claims and complaints of Japan. It then proceeded with a narrative of the events in Manchuria subsequent to September 18, 1931, based on the evidence of many participants and on that of eyewitnesses. It devoted particular attention to the origins and development of the State of Manchukuo, which had already been proclaimed by the time the Commission reached Manchuria. It also covered the question of the economic interests of Japan both in Manchuria and China as a whole, and the nature and effects of the Chinese anti-Japanese boycott. Soviet Union interests in the region were also mentioned. Finally, the Commission submitted a study of the conditions to which, in its judgment, any satisfactory solution should conform, and made various proposals and suggestions as to how an agreement embodying these principles might be brought about.

However, the report did not directly address one of its chief goals: the cause of the Mukden Incident. Instead, it simply stated the Japanese position (that the Chinese had been responsible),  with no comment as to the truth or falsity of the Japanese claims. Although there was no doubt as to Japan's guilt among the five commission members, Claudel (the French delegate) insisted that Japan not be portrayed as the aggressor.

In spite of care to preserve impartiality between the conflicting views of China and Japan, the effect of the Report was regarded as a substantial vindication of the Chinese case on most fundamental issues. In particular, the Commission stated that the operations of the Imperial Japanese Army following on the Mukden incident could not be regarded as legitimate self-defence. Regarding Manchukuo, the Report concluded that the new State could not have been formed without the presence of Japanese troops; that it had no general Chinese support; and that it was not part of a genuine and spontaneous independent movement. Still, the report held that both China and Japan had legitimate grievances. Japan, it states, took advantage of questionable rights, and China obstructed by the exercise of her undoubted rights. The Geneva correspondent of the "Daily Telegraph" says: "The report, which was approved unanimously, proposes that China and Japan shall be given three months in which to accept or reject the recommendations. It is hoped that the parties will agree to direct negotiations."

The "Daily Telegraph" French correspondent says: "The report insists on the withdrawal of Japanese troops within the South Manchuria railway zone, and recommends the establishment of an organisation under the sovereignty of China to deal with conditions in Manchuria, taking due account of the rights and interests of Japan, and the formation of a committee of negotiation for the application of these and other recommendations."

Consequences 
In September 1932, even before the official announcement of the findings of the Lytton Report on October 2, 1932, was made public, the Japanese government extended official diplomatic recognition to the puppet government of Manchukuo. When the findings of the Report were announced before the General Assembly of the League of Nations, and a motion was raised to condemn Japan as an aggressor in February 1933, the Japanese delegation led by ambassador Yosuke Matsuoka walked out. Japan gave formal notice of its withdrawal from the League of Nations on March 27, 1933. The United States announced the Stimson Doctrine, which warned Japan that areas gained by conquest would not be recognized.

In the end, the Lytton Report basically served to show the weaknesses of the League of Nations and its inability to enforce its decisions. The situation was complicated by the length of time it took for the Lytton Commission to prepare its report, during which time Japan was able to firmly secure its control over Manchuria and was thus able to reject the condemnation of the League with impunity.

References

Further reading
 * Chang, David Wen-wei. "The Western Powers and Japan's Aggression in China: The League of Nations and 'The Lytton Report.'" American Journal of Chinese Studies (2003) 19#1 pp 43–63.
 Jin, Wensi, and Wên-ssŭ Chin. China and the League of nations: the Sino-Japanese controversy (St. John's University Press, 1965).
 Kuhn, Arthur K. "The Lytton Report on the Manchurian Crisis." American Journal of International Law 27.1 (1933): 96–100. in JSTOR
 Nish, Ian Hill. Japan's Struggle with Internationalism: Japan, China, and the League of Nations, 1931-3 (Routledge, 1993).
 Saito, Hirosi. "A Japanese view of the Manchurian situation." The Annals of the American Academy of Political and Social Science 165 (1933): 159–166. in JSTOR
 Walters, Francis Paul. A History of The League of Nations. London, UK: Oxford University Press, 1960. pg 491–492. That book is freely available on the site of the United Nations Office in Geneva online

External links
 Full text of the report
Observations of Japan to the report (from p. 88, or 8 by file's numbering) end of Japan's observations and comments by China to those observations
 Discussion on the report in the Assembly of the League of Nations. Part 1 Part 2
 US History.com site

History of Manchuria
1931 in Japan
1931 in China
League of Nations
1931 in international relations
1931 documents
Foreign relations of Manchukuo